The Meenakshi Academy of Higher Education and Research (MAHER), commonly referred to as Meenakshi University, is a private deemed-to-be-university for mainly medical science in Chennai, Tamil Nadu, India.

History

Meenakshi University was created in the year 1983 by the Ministry of Human Resource Development and received approval of the University Grants Commission.

The chancellor is Thiru A.N. Radhakrishnan and the vice-chancellor is T. Gunasagaran.

Affiliates
Meenakshi University includes Meenakshi Medical College and Research Institute (in Enathur, Kanchipuram); Meenakshi Ammal Dental College in Maduravoyal, Chennai; Meenakshi Engineering College in K. K. Nagar, and Meenakshi College of Nursing in Mangadu, Faculty of Engineering and Technology Mangadu, Chennai.

Academics
The university awards the following undergraduate degrees: Bachelor of Medicine, Bachelor of Surgery, Bachelor of Dental Surgery, Bachelor of Science (Nursing), and Bachelor of Physiotherapy and Bachelor of Engineering.

It awards the following postgraduate degrees: Master of Medical Education, Master of Science, Master of Dental Surgery, Master of Science (Nursing), Master of Physiotherapy and Bachelor in Engineering. It also offers specialty courses leading to a doctorate in medicine or master's in chirurgical, as well as PhD programs.

Rankings

Meenakshi Academy of Higher Education and Research was ranked in the 101-150 band among universities in India by the National Institutional Ranking Framework (NIRF) in 2020 and in the 101-150 band in overall category.

References

External links

Universities in Chennai
1983 establishments in Tamil Nadu
Educational institutions established in 1983